The Mystery of the Leaping Fish is a 1916 American short silent comedy film starring Douglas Fairbanks, Bessie Love, and Alma Rubens. Directed by John Emerson, the story was written by Tod Browning with intertitles by Anita Loos.

A 35 mm print of the film still exists in its entirety and is currently in the public domain.

Overview 

In this unusually broad comedy for Fairbanks, the acrobatic leading man plays "Coke Ennyday", a cocaine-shooting detective who is a parody of Sherlock Holmes. Ennyday is given to injecting himself from a bandolier of syringes worn across his chest, and liberally helps himself to the contents of a hatbox-sized round container of white powder labeled "COCAINE" on his desk.

Fairbanks' character otherwise lampoons Sherlock Holmes with checkered detective hat, clothes and even car, along with the aforementioned propensity for injecting cocaine whenever he feels momentarily down, then laughing with delight. A device used for observing visitors, which is referred to in the title cards as his "scientific periscope", bears a close resemblance to a modern closed-circuit television. What is apparently a clock face has "EATS, DRINKS, SLEEPS, and DOPE" instead of numbers.

The film displays a lighthearted and comic attitude toward Coke Ennyday's use of cocaine and laudanum. While he catches a gang of drug smugglers, he stops them only after sampling their opium.

Cast 
 Douglas Fairbanks as Coke Ennyday/Himself
 Bessie Love as the little fish blower
 Alma Rubens as his female accomplice
 Allan Sears as Gent Rolling in Wealth (credited as A.D. Sears)
 Charles Stevens as Japanese Accomplice
 Tom Wilson as Police Chief I.M. Keene
 George Hall as Japanese accomplice (uncredited)
 William Lowery as gang leader (uncredited)
 Joe Murphy as footman on vehicle (uncredited)
 B.F. Zeidman as scenario editor (uncredited)

Themes 
The Mystery of the Leaping Fish was released in 1916, the first year after the Harrison Act took effect. Narcotic prohibition was still a new concept in the United States, and the use of opiates and cocaine was much more socially acceptable than today. Furthermore, the censorious Hays Code would not be instituted for another fourteen years after the film's release. With the introduction of the code, depictions of intravenous drug use were not shown in major motion pictures. During the era of the Hays Code, films that dealt with controversial topics such as drug use were morality plays that illustrate the degradation that surrounds the use of such drugs.

Production 
Running a total of 25 minutes, the film was initially shot by Christy Cabanne, who was later fired from the production.
John Emerson was hired and re-shot the film with the help of Tod Browning.

When filming in Chinatown, the production was attacked by members of the community, because the producers had not requested to film in the neighborhood.

Reception 
The film was a departure for Fairbanks due to the subject matter and the fact that he generally appeared in feature films, not two-reelers. The Mystery of the Leaping Fish was the second film Fairbanks did with director John Emerson, their first being His Picture in the Papers (released in February 1916) which was a hit.

While The Mystery of the Leaping Fish is now considered something of a cult film due its comedic dealings of drug use, Fairbanks hated the film and reportedly wanted to have it withdrawn from circulation. Fairbanks biographer Jeffrey Vance describes The Mystery of the Leaping Fish as "undoubtedly the most bizarre film Fairbanks made" and that the entire scenario is "a hallucinogenic odyssey into the absurd...."

References 
Citations

Works cited

External links 

 
 
 
 

1916 comedy films
1916 films
American black-and-white films
Silent American comedy films
American parody films
American silent short films
Articles containing video clips
Films about cocaine
Films about drugs
Films directed by Christy Cabanne
Films directed by John Emerson
Films with screenplays by Anita Loos
Surviving American silent films
Triangle Film Corporation films
1910s American films